WDOS (730 AM) is a radio station broadcasting a news/talk format. Licensed to Oneonta, New York, United States, the station is currently owned by Townsquare Media. It features programming from Fox News Radio, NBC News Radio, Compass Media Networks, Premiere Networks, Radio America, and Westwood One .

References

External links

DOS
Townsquare Media radio stations